The Islamic State in the Greater Sahara (IS-GS) is an Islamist militant group adhering to the ideology of Salafi Jihadism. IS-GS was formed on 15 May 2015 as the result of a split within the militant group Al-Mourabitoun. The rift was a reaction to the adherence of one of its leaders, Adnan Abu Walid al-Sahraoui, to the Islamic State. From March 2019 to 2022, IS-GS was formally part of the Islamic State – West Africa Province (ISWAP); when it was also called "ISWAP-Greater Sahara". In March 2022, IS declared the province autonomous, separating it from its West Africa Province  and naming it Islamic State Sahel Province (ISSP).

History 
Al-Mourabitoun was created on 22 August 2013 after the merging of MUJAO and Al-Mulathameen. On 13 May 2015, elements of Al-Mourabitoun under the leadership of Abu Walid al-Sahraoui pledged allegiance to the Islamic State. It operated independently until 30 October 2016, when it was formally recognised by the Islamic State.

The group's ranks increased by dozens of Mali militants and sympathizers from the Gao Region near Ménaka.

On November 28, 2019, Spanish authorities issued a warning on the possibility of a terror attack in the region against Spanish citizens visiting or working in the Saharawi refugee camps in Western Sahara.

Spanish authorities feared the attacks would coincide with the Spanish Día de la Constitución (December 6) celebrations. Secret services warned of the risk of a jihadist attack in the Sahara region at refugee camps in Tindouf, Algeria. Sahrawi Arab Democratic Republic denied this threat. No attack happened.

During 2021, the group carried out massacres in Niger, mainly in the regions of Tillabéri and Tahoua, killing more than 600 people.

In December 2021, the French army announced that it had killed in Niger, one of the perpetrators of the assassination of six French humanitarian workers and their Nigerien companions in the Kouré reserve in August 2020. The man is presented as Soumana Boura. The staff had identified him as leading a group of several dozen EIGS fighters, in the Gober Gourou and Firo area, in western Niger. a member of the Islamic State in the Grand Sahara (EIGS).

On 15 June 2022, it was announced the French military force captured Oumeya Ould Albakaye, a senior ISGS leader in Mali overnight between 11-12 June.

Organization, forces and location

Commanding officers 

The group was founded and headed by Adnan Abu Walid Al-Sahraoui until he was killed by a French drone strike in Mali in 2021.

Al-Sahraoui may have been replaced towards the end of 2019 by a new emir, Abdoul Hakim Al-Sahraoui. Among his other commanders are Doundoun Chefou, Illiassou Djibo alias Petit Chafori (or Djafori) and Mohamed Ag Almouner, known as "Tinka", killed by the French army on August 26, 2018.

Forces 

In early 2017, Marc Mémier, a researcher at the  French Institute for International Relations (IFRI), estimated that the Islamic State in the Grand Sahara had a few dozen men – not counting sympathizers – mostly Malians in the region of Gao. At the end of 2015, RFI indicated that the group's workforce would total around one hundred.

According to a report from the Combating Terrorism Center (CTC) at West Point, the EIGS had 425 combatants in August 2018.

Settlement area and ethnic base 

The group is based in the Ménaka region.

As with other armed groups in the Sahel, jihadists or not, the EIGS is part of a largely community-based dynamic. A large part of its combatants are thus Peuls. In Mali, the latter are for the most part Nigerien nationals whom the droughts and the demographic surge of Zarma and Hausa peasants, which is exerted from the south to the north, have pushed on the Malian side of the border. Adnan Abu Walid Al-Sahraoui won the support of many members of this community by promising to protect them against raids and theft of cattle carried out by the Tuaregs, starting with the Dahoussahak (Idaksahak).

However, the EIGS would include members from the two communities. Thus, at present, the combatants of the EIGS are divided into two katibas (combatant units), one composed mainly of Daoussahak and the other of Peuls.

Analysis

Designation as a terrorist organization

See also 
Tongo Tongo ambush

References

Works cited

Further reading 
 

Factions of the Islamic State of Iraq and the Levant
Islamic organizations established in 2015
Military units and formations established in 2015
Organizations designated as terrorist by Iraq
Rebel groups in Burkina Faso
Rebel groups in Mali
Rebel groups in Niger
Salafi Jihadist groups